The 2013–14 season is FK Turnovo's 6th consecutive season in First League. This article shows player statistics and all official matches that the club will play during the 2013–14 season.

Squad
As of 10 February 2014

Left club during season

Competitions

First League

Results summary

Results by round

Results

Table

Macedonian Cup

First round

Second round

Europa League

Qualifying rounds

First qualifying round

Second qualifying round

Statistics

Top scorers

References

FK Horizont Turnovo seasons
Turnovo
Turnovo